Camp is an unincorporated community in Fulton County, Arkansas, United States. Camp is located on Arkansas Highway 9, approximately six miles northeast of Salem. Camp Creek is a very 
small creek at its deepest point is 3 1/2 feet that flows past the community.

Camp has a post office with ZIP code 72520.

References

Unincorporated communities in Fulton County, Arkansas
Unincorporated communities in Arkansas